= Red Ox Inn =

Red Ox Inn Hanul Boul Roșu
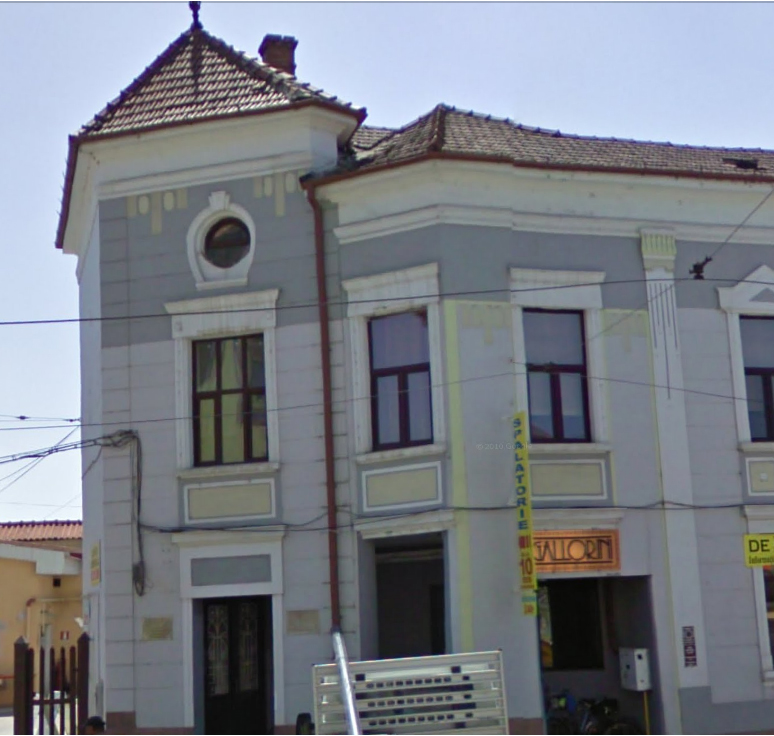

- Location within Romania

General information
- Location: Arad, Romania, Str. Tribunul Dobra 20, Arad 310101
- Coordinates: 46.167607°N 21.319723°E

Website
- www.boulrosu.com

Red Ox Inn (Hanul Boul Roșu) is a historic monument and hotel in Arad, Romania. It was built in the first half of 19th century for the traders coming to the city fairs.

The basic facts:

- the inn was built on the ox market, today Arena market
- on the ground floor was the restaurant and on the first floor the hotel
- in 1890 there was the first celebration of the First May on the area of today Romania.
